Senator Braden may refer to:

Henry Braden (1944–2013), Louisiana State Senate
Thomas H. Braden (1874–after 1941), Massachusetts State Senate